The San Isidro Air Base   became operational on March 23, 1953 and is located 25 km east of Santo Domingo. It was named Base Aérea Trujillo until 1961, when the name was changed to San Isidro. Most of the units, aircraft, and helicopters of the Dominican Air Force are based there.

The San Isidro track also has been a venue for automobile racing events.

The San Isidro VOR/DME (Ident: SIS) is located on the field.

See also

Transport in the Dominican Republic
List of airports in the Dominican Republic

References

External links
OpenStreetMap - San Isidro Air Base
OurAirports - San Isidro Air Base
SkyVector - San Isidro Air Base
FallingRain - San Isidro Air Base Airport

Military of the Dominican Republic
Airports in the Dominican Republic
Santo Domingo